The final of the Men's 100 metres Freestyle event at the European LC Championships 1997 was held on Thursday 21 August 1997 in Seville, Spain.

Finals

Qualifying heats

Remarks

See also
1996 Men's Olympic Games 100m Freestyle
1997 Men's World Championships (SC) 100m Freestyle

References
 scmsom results
La Gazzetta Archivio
 swimrankings

F